David McClain may refer to:

 David McClain (president), president of the University of Hawaii System
 David H. McClain (born 1933), American politician
 Dave McClain (American football) (1938–1986), American football coach
 Dave McClain (musician) (born 1965), drummer for Machine Head